Blackhawk Park is a park in Vernon County, Wisconsin within the Driftless Area along the Mississippi River. The  park features views of steep limestone bluffs and the river valleys. Wildlife viewing is a popular activity, including the variety of birds which inhabit or migrate through the park. Hiking trails, boat launch facilities, and camping are available. The park is owned and managed by the U.S. Army Corps of Engineers as a recreation area within Pool 9. The park is surrounded by the Upper Mississippi River National Wildlife and Fish Refuge.

See also
Lock and Dam No. 9
List of locks and dams of the Upper Mississippi River

References

External links
Blackhawk Park - U.S. Army Corps of Engineers, St. Paul District
Upper Mississippi River National Wildlife and Fish Refuge - U.S. Fish and Wildlife Service

Driftless Area
Protected areas on the Mississippi River
Protected areas of Vernon County, Wisconsin